The Turkish Land Forces, or Turkish Army, is the main branch of the Turkish Armed Forces responsible for land-based military operations. The army was formed on November 8, 1920, after the collapse of the Ottoman Empire. Significant campaigns since the foundation of the army include suppression of rebellions in Turkish Kurdistan from the 1920s to the present day, combat in the Korean War, the 1974 Turkish invasion of Cyprus and the current Turkish involvement in the Syrian Civil War, as well as its NATO alliance against the USSR during the Cold War. The army holds the preeminent place within the armed forces. It is customary for the Chief of the General Staff of the Turkish Armed Forces to have been the Commander of the Turkish Land Forces prior to his appointment as Turkey's senior ranking officer. Alongside the other two armed services, the Turkish Army has frequently intervened in Turkish politics, a custom that is now regulated to an extent by the reform of the National Security Council. The current commander of the Turkish Land Forces is General Musa Avsever.

From late 2015, the Turkish Army (along with the rest of the Armed Forces) saw its personnel strengths increased to a similar level as the previous decade. Factors that contributed to this growth include the Turkish occupation of northern Syria, as well as a renewal of the Kurdish-Turkish conflict.

History

The Turkish Army traces its origin to the Ottoman Army. A theory accepted officially was that the Ottoman Armed Forces had been founded in 1363, when the Pençik corps (the predecessor of the Janissary corps) had been formed and, in this context, on 28 June 1963, it celebrated the 600th anniversary of its foundation. In the same year, one of the prominent Pan-Turkists, Nihal Atsız, asserted that the Turkish Army had been founded in 209 BC, when Modu Chanyu of the Xiongnu is thought to have formed an army based on the decimal system. In 1968, Yılmaz Öztuna proposed this theory to Cemal Tural, who was the Chief of the General Staff of the Republic of Turkey at the time. In 1973, when the Turkish Army celebrated the 610th anniversary of its foundation, Nihal Atsız published his claim again. After the 1980 Turkish coup d'état, the Turkish Army formally adopted the date 209 BC as its year of foundation.

War of Independence

The modern Turkish Army has its foundations in nine remnant Ottoman Army corps after the Armistice of Mudros at the end of World War I. After the rise of Turkish resistances (Kuva-yi Milliye) in Anatolia, Mustafa Kemal Pasha and his colleagues formed the Grand National Assembly (GNA) in Ankara on April 23, 1920, Kâzım Pasha's XV Corps was the only corps which at that time had any combat value. On November 8, 1920, the GNA decided to establish a standing army (Düzenli ordu) instead of irregular troops (Kuva-yi Milliye, Çerkes Ethem's Kuva-yi Seyyare etc.).

On August 26, 1922, the Army of the Grand National Assembly (Büyük Millet Meclisi Ordusu) launched the general offensive known as the Great Offensive (Büyük Taarruz) against the Greek forces around Kara Hisâr-ı Sâhip. Nurettin Pasha's 1st Army and Yakup Şevki Pasha's 2nd Army encircled the main body of Major General Nikolaos Trikoupis's group and defeated it near Dumlupınar. Fahrettin Pasha's V Cavalry Corps entered Smyrna (Izmir) on September 9, 1922. Şükrü Naili Pasha's III Corps entered Constantinople (Istanbul) peacefully on October 6, 1923. Subsequent to the founding of the Republic of Turkey, the Army of the GNA was reorganized into three army inspectorates (ordu müfettişliği, 1st, 2nd and 3rd army inspectorate).

First Kurdish rebellions and lead-up to WWII

There were several Kurdish rebellions in the South-East of Turkey in the 1920s and 1930s, the most important of which were the 1925 Sheikh Said rebellion and the 1937 Dersim rebellion. All were suppressed by the TAF, sometimes involving large-scale mobilisations of up to 50,000 troops. Associated atrocities against civilians include the Zilan massacre.

In 1935, Turkey purchased 60 T-26 modified 1933 light tanks from the USSR (also, two twin-turreted T-26 mod. 1931 were presented to the Turkish government in 1933–1934), along with about 60 BA-6 armoured cars to form the 1st Tank Battalion of the 2nd Cavalry Division at Lüleburgaz. The Armoured Brigade of the Turkish Army consisted of the 102nd and the 103rd Companies armed with the T-26 mod. 1933 tanks (four platoons in a company, five tanks in the platoon) at the end of 1937. The reserve group of the brigade had 21 T-26 tanks also. At the beginning of 1940, the Turkish Army had the Armoured Brigade in Istanbul, which belonged to the 1st Army, and the 1st Tank Battalion, which belonged to the 3rd Army. Turkish T-26 tanks were taken out of service in 1942.

World War II
During World War II, Turkey mobilized more than a million personnel. The Turkish Army order of battle in 1941 shows a number of formations. Neutral for most of the war, Turkey declared war on Nazi Germany in February 1945, after being given an ultimatum by the Allies of World War II to do so by March 1, 1945, if Turkey wanted a seat in the future United Nations.

Cold War era
In August 1947, the American Military Mission for Aid to Turkey (JAMMAT) was established in Ankara under the authority of the US ambassador. Hastened by the Soviet threat during the Turkish straits crisis, large amounts of United States military aid began arriving.

In December 1948 the Turkish Army was described as 3 armies, 13 army corps, 35 infantry divisions; 3 cavalry divisions, 6 armoured brigades, and 4 fortress commands at 33% of war strength; and 309,300 strong exclusive of additional security troops.

The command of the Turkish Army was formed on July 1, 1949, and Nuri Yamut was appointed as the first commander of the Turkish Army.

Korean War
The Turkish Army participated in the Korean War as a member state of the United Nations. Of the 5,000 soldiers of the Turkish Brigade there, 731 were killed. They fought in the Battle of Wawon where it was credited with saving the U.S. 2nd Infantry Division from encirclement. The brigade also fought at Gimnyangjang-ni, 'Operation Ripper,' or the Fourth Battle of Seoul, and the Battle of the Hook.

Invasion of Cyprus

In July 1974, Turkey intervened in Cyprus, following a coup organized by EOKA-B and led by Nikos Sampson who ousted the democratically elected Cypriot President Archbishop Makarios III in order to establish Enosis (Union) between Cyprus and Greece. The coup was backed by the Greek military junta in Athens.

The 1974 Turkish military operations in Cyprus can be divided into two distinct Turkish offensives, the first being "Atilla 1", which commenced in the early hours of July 20, 1974, with an amphibious landing force, directed by the 6th Corps, forming a beachhead at Kyrenia's Five Mile Beach. It comprised only infantry troops, but was supported by rolling air and naval artillery attacks, and met with limited resistance from the Cyprus National Guard, which was in disarray as a result of the July 15, 1974 coup. The majority of fighting ceased on the 23rd of July, though sporadic clashes continued after this date until the 14th of August. "Atilla 1" successfully achieved its objective of forming a bridgehead with the Turkish Cypriot enclave of Agyrta-Nicosia.

The second Turkish offensive began on August 14, 1974, as Greek and Turkish Cypriot representatives met in Geneva to discuss the situation on the island. Turkish pleas for international intervention having failed and very slow diplomatic progress, in addition to being confined to an indefensible and non-viable region in Cyprus, Turkish Armed forces took action again. Despite a UN ceasefire in place (several had already been disregarded), the Turkish Army, massively reinforced from weeks of build-up, launched an all-out surprise attack on ill-prepared Greek Cypriot and Greek units. With the little answer to the masses of armour, mechanised units, artillery, and air support that the Turks could bring to bear, virtually all Greek Cypriot defences collapsed in a matter of days, and by August 16, 1974, Turkish forces, spearheaded by the 28th and 39th Infantry Divisions, had extended to capture some 37% of the island, including the towns of Famagusta, Varosha and Morphou.

The conflict in Cyprus resulted in the de facto division of the island between the Turkish Cypriot controlled north and the Greek Cypriot controlled south. Turkey still maintains troops in Cyprus, since a political solution could not yet be achieved and since many members of the Turkish Cypriot community fear a return to the intercommunal violence which occurred between 1963 and 1974.

Historical units and structure

The Turkish Army has since the mid-1960s operated on a corps-division-brigade system, with a varying number of divisions and brigades assigned to a corps. The IISS Military Balance 1966–67 recorded a total strength of 360,000, with 16 infantry divisions (14 NATO assigned), 4 armoured brigades (Zırhlı tugay) with M47 Patton tanks, armoured cavalry regiments, and two parachute battalions. At some point in the 1960s the Army apparently utilised the Pentomic structure for a period, before adopting the American ROAD divisional organisation. Back in the early 1970s, there was a 6th Infantry Division based at Istanbul.

The U.S. Area Handbook for the Republic of Turkey, written by Thomas Roberts, said in late 1968 that the army had 425,000 men (p. 385), three field armies (First: Istanbul, Second: Konya, Third: Erzurum), thirteen infantry divisions, one armoured division (with M-47s and M-48s), four armoured brigades (M47 Patton tanks), two armoured cavalry regiment, two mechanised infantry brigades, and two parachute battalions. There was a trained reserve of 450,000.

According to official British military reports in 1974, the Turkish Army included the First Army (2nd, 3rd, 5th, and 15th Corps), Second Army (4th, 6th, and 7th) and Third Army (8th, 9th and 11th Corps). There were also three Interior Zones with three recruit training divisions and four recruit training brigades. For a long period, these formations were grouped under the NATO headquarters Allied Land Forces South-Eastern Europe (LANDSOUTHEAST) in Izmir, led by a Turkish Army four-star General.

In 1981–82, the Army had one armoured division, two mechanised infantry divisions, and fourteen Infantry Divisions, with 3,000 M47 MBTs, 500 M48 MBTs, as well as 70 Leopard 1A3 on order, for a total of 3570 tanks.

Until the dissolution of the Warsaw Pact in 1990, the Army had a static defense mission of countering any possible attack on Thrace by Soviet/Warsaw Pact forces and deterring Greece, and any attack by the Soviet Transcaucasus Military District on the Caucasus frontier. The Third Army was responsible for holding the Caucasus line with about a third of the Army's total strength of one armoured, two mechanised, and fourteen infantry divisions (1986 data). Soviet forces immediately facing the Third Army in the Caucasus were the 31st Army Corps in the Georgian SSR and the 7th Guards Army in the Armenian SSR. Together the 31st Corps and 7th Guards Army had six divisions (roughly three Category "B" and three "C") plus some immobile fortified defence areas.

Nigel Thomas's NATO Armies 1949–87, published in 1988, attributed the 2nd, 3rd Corps, 5th, and 15th Corps to the First Army; the 6th and 7th Corps to the Second Army, the 4th, 8th, and 9th Corps to the Third Army, and the 11th Corps to the Aegean Army. He wrote that the 11th Corps comprised the 28th and 39th Divisions.

When the General Staff attempted to shift 120,000 troops to the frontier with Iraq in 1990, they discovered that there were serious deficiencies in the Army's ability to respond to crises that could erupt suddenly in distant regions.

After the fall of the Soviet Union LANDSOUTHEAST in Izmir became Joint Command Southeast for a period, before becoming Allied Air Component Command Izmir in 2004. The headquarters' land-focused roots were revived in the 2010s when NATO's two air commands were reduced into one (at Ramstein, Germany) and Allied Land Command was established at the site.

Modernization and current status

Towards the end of the 1980s, a restructuring and modernization process has been initiated by the Turkish Armed Forces, which still continues today. The final goal of Turkey is to produce indigenous military equipment and to become increasingly self-sufficient in terms of military technologies.

The then-Army Commander said of further modernization efforts in 2006:
Gen. Büyükanıt, who sent crucial messages regarding the future of the Land Forces, said that the country's own instabilities should also be taken into consideration. He reported that the land forces will shrink considerably within the next eight years. But he said that despite this process, the force's capacities will be increased.

"The Land Forces aim at being equipped with new opportunities and capabilities in order to carry out its duty in full strength against a large variety of threats, varying from classical threats to asymmetrical ones.

"The targets for our land forces are to be realized through 'Forces 2014' project. This project aims to shrink the forces without undermining its combat capabilities. On the contrary, under the plan, the efficiency of the force will increase.

"Within this period of time, the Land Forces will gradually decrease by 20 to 30 percent in terms of the number of personnel and forces formations. It will be equipped with modern arms and war devices as the distinct features of this new formation. Thus the battle capability will be given to high-ranking brigades. Moreover, with the Combat Zone Management System, the land tactical map will be numerically formed in real-time or close to real-time and a constant tracking will be provided," said Büyükanıt. (The New Anatolian, Evren Değer, 10 August 2006.)

At present, the primary main battle tanks of the Turkish Army are the Leopard 2A4 and the M60T. There are also around 400 Leopard 1 and 750 M60 Patton variants in service (excluding the M60T which were upgraded with the 120 mm MG253 guns), but the Turkish Army retains a large number of older vehicles. More than 2,800 M48 Pattons are still in service (upgraded with the 105 mm M68 guns) though only around 1,300 of these are stored as reserve MBTs, while the rest are mostly transformed into other types of military vehicles (such as cranes, MBT recovery vehicles and logistical support vehicles) or used as spare parts resources.

Turkey plans to build a total of 1,000 new Otokar Altay MBTs, in four separate batches of 250 units, with the MİTÜP Turkish National Tank Project. The tanks will be produced by the Turkish firm Otokar, and share some of the systems that are used in the K2 Black Panther main battle tank of South Korea.

Turkey has signed an agreement with the US to buy fourteen CH-47F Chinook helicopters, for $400 million. Because of financial constraints, however, the Undersecretariat for the Defense Industry, or SSM, Turkey's procurement agency, later wanted to buy only six CH-47Fs, five for the Army and one for the Special Forces, leaving a decision on the remaining eight platforms for the future. Contract negotiations between the SSM, the U.S. government and Boeing were launched last year.

The length of compulsory military service is six months for private and non-commissioned soldiers (the service term for reserve officers chosen among university or college graduates is 12 months). All male Turkish citizens over the age of 20 are required to undergo a one-month military training period, but they can obtain an exemption from the remaining five months of their mandatory service with a paid exemption option.

Turkey has chosen a Chinese defence firm to co-produce a US$4 billion long-range air and missile defence system FD-2000, rejecting rival bids from Russian, US and European firms. The Turkish defence minister announced the decision to award the contract to China Precision Machinery Import and Export Corp (CPMIEC) in a statement on Thursday, September 26, 2013. NATO has said that missiles should be compatible.

In 2017, Turkey has bought the anti-aircraft S-400 missile system from Russia.

The TLF has seen frequent recent combat around and beyond its borders. It is fighting a conflict in south-eastern Turkey against the prolonged Kurdish PKK insurgency, and monitoring ISIS, Russian intervention in Syria, the Kurdish YPG, as well as multiple other elements, in Syria. It maintained a prolonged command of Regional Command Capital in ISAF. Thus the TLF has had extensive combat experience.

Structure

The structure of the Turkish Army has historically had two facets: operational and administrative. The operational chain consists of the field fighting formations, and the administrative the arms and service branches – infantry, armour, artillery etc.

Operational organisation

The army's 14 armoured brigades are the most powerful brigades in the restructured organisation; each includes 2 armoured, 2 mechanised infantry and 2 self-propelled artillery battalions. The 17 mechanised brigades each have 1 armoured, 2 mechanised and one artillery battalion. The army's 9 infantry brigades each have 4 infantry battalions and one artillery battalion, while the 4 commando brigades have 3 commando battalions.

From 1992 the Army began to change from a corps-division-regiment structure to a corps-brigade arrangement, with divisions remaining on Cyprus and for certain special other cases, such as for NATO's reaction forces. In accordance with NATO's new strategy in the early 1990s, Turkey agreed to commit forces to NATO's ACE Rapid Reaction Corps. 'Therefore, the decision was made to create a new division. Thus, the old 1 Inf Div which had been abolished many years ago was reactivated and renamed as 1 TU Mech Inf Div and attached to 4 TU Corps on 30 November 1993.’ This division appears to have been replaced within 3rd Corps by the 52nd Armoured Division, formed later on.

The Military Balance, 1994–1995 also lists the following units: the Presidential Guard Regiment, an infantry regiment, 5 border defense regiments (Brigades (?)), and 26 border defense battalions. The fate of these independent units under the reorganization remains unclear.

In late 2002 the 3rd Corps, with its headquarters near Istanbul, was certified as one of the six NATO High Readiness Force-Land (HRF-L) headquarters and gained the additional title of the Rapidly Deployable Turkish Corps (RDTC). A year later, Jane's Defence Weekly reported on 9 July 2003 that as part of force restructuring, its 4 existing armies would be reorganized into a Western Army, in Istanbul, and the Eastern Army would replace 2nd Army in Malatya. This plan does not appear to have been carried out.

The Army announced plans in mid-2004 to abolish four brigades across Turkey. The arms and equipment of the brigades closed will be kept in depots. The plan involves the disbandment of:
 The 33rd Mechanized Brigade in Kırklareli on the north-west border with Greece and Bulgaria
 The 7th Mechanized Brigade in Kars/Kağızman near the eastern border with Armenia
 The 10th Infantry Brigade in Van/Erciş on the eastern border with Iran
 The 9th Armoured Brigade in Çankırı in central Anatolia

The IISS and the Turkish Army's website give differing figures as to the number of formations in the Army. The official site gives totals of 9 Army Corps, 1 Infantry Division, 2 Mechanized Infantry Divisions, 1 Armored Division, 1 Training Division, 11 Infantry / Motorized Infantry Brigades, 16 Mechanized Infantry Brigades, 9 Armored Brigades, 5 Para-Commando Brigades, 1 Army Aviation Brigade, 2 Artillery Brigades, 5 Training Brigades and one Humanitarian Aid Brigade.

The IISS Military Balance 2008 lists the Turkish Land Forces with 4 Army HQ, 10 corps HQ, 17 armoured brigades, 15 mechanised infantry brigades, 2 infantry divisions, 11 infantry brigades, 1 Special Force command HQ, 5 commando brigades, one combat helicopter battalion, 4 aviation regiments, 3 aviation battalions (totalling 1 transport and 2 training battalions), and 4 training/artillery brigades.

List of formations and units

A basic organigram on the official Turkish Land Forces website shows the First, Second, Third, and Aegean Armies, the 4th Corps, the force in Northern Cyprus, the Training and Doctrine Command, and the Logistics Command as directly subordinated to the Chief of the Land Forces.

The Turkish Army is organised into the following commands:

 Land Forces Command – Ankara
 1st Army (Istanbul)
 2nd Corps (Gelibolu, Çanakkale)
 4th Mechanized Infantry Brigade (Keşan)
 8th Mechanized Infantry Brigade (Tekirdağ)
 18th Mechanized Infantry Brigade (Çanakkale)
 95th Armored Brigade (Malkara)
 102nd Artillery Regiment (Uzunköprü)
 41st Commando Brigade (Vize)
 Corps Engineer Combat Regiment (Gelibolu)
 3rd Corps (NATO Rapid Deployment Corps, Şişli, Istanbul)
 52nd Tactical Armored Division (Hadımköy, Istanbul)
 2nd Armored Brigade (Kartal)
 3rd Armored Brigade (Çerkezköy)
 66th Mechanized Infantry Brigade (Istanbul)
 23rd Tactical Motorized Infantry Division (Hasdal, Istanbul)
 6th Motorized Infantry Regiment (Hasdal, Istanbul)
 23rd Motorized Infantry Regiment (Samandıra, Istanbul)
 47th Motorized Infantry Regiment (Metris, Istanbul)
 5th Corps (Çorlu, Tekirdağ)
 1st Armored Brigade (Babaeski)
 54th Mechanized Infantry Brigade (Edirne)
 55th Mechanized Infantry Brigade (Süloğlu)
 65th Mechanized Infantry Brigade (Lüleburgaz)
 Corps Armored Cavalry Battalion (Ulaş)
 105th Artillery Regiment (Çorlu)
 Corps Engineer Combat Regiment (Pınarhisar)
 15th Infantry Division (Köseköy, İzmit)
 2nd Army (Malatya)
 4th Corps(Ankara)
 28th Mechanized Infantry Brigade (Mamak)
 58th Artillery Regiment (Polatlı)
 1st Commando Brigade (Talas)
 2nd Commando Brigade (Bolu)
 6th Corps (Adana)
 5th Armored Brigade (Gaziantep)
 39th Mechanized Infantry Brigade (İskenderun)
 106th Artillery Regiment (Islahiye)
 7th Corps (Diyarbakır)
 3rd Tactical Infantry Division (Yüksekova)
 34th Border Brigade (Şemdinli)
 16th Mechanized Brigade (Diyarbakır)
 20th Mechanized Brigade (Şanlıurfa)
 70th Mechanized Infantry Brigade (Mardin)
 172nd Armored Brigade (Silopi)
 2nd Motorized Infantry Brigade (Lice)
 6th Motorized Infantry Brigade (Akçay)
 3rd Commando Brigade (Siirt)
 107th Artillery Regiment (Siverek)
 Hakkari Mountain Warfare and Commando Brigade (hakkari)
 3rd Army (Erzincan)
 8th Corps (Elazığ)
 1st Mechanized Infantry Brigade (Doğubeyazıt)
 12th Mechanized Infantry Brigade (Ağrı)
 10th Motorized Infantry Brigade (Tatvan)
 34th Motorized Infantry Brigade (Patnos)
 49th Motorized Infantry Brigade (Bingöl)
 51st Motorized Infantry Brigade (Hozat)
 4th Commando Brigade (Tunceli)
 108th Artillery Regiment (Erciş)
 17th Motorized Infantry Brigade (Kiğı)
 9th Corps (Erzurum)
 4th Armored Brigade (Palandöken)
 14th Mechanized Infantry Brigade (Kars)
 25th Mechanized Infantry Brigade (Ardahan)
 9th Motorized Infantry Brigade (Sarıkamış)
 48th Motorized Infantry Brigade (Trabzon)
 109th Artillery Regiment (Erzurum)
 Aegean Army (Izmir)
 Cyprus Turkish Peace Force
 28th Infantry Division – headquartered at Asha (Paşaköy) to the northeast of Nicosia, and the
 39th Infantry Division – headquartered at Camlibel within the district of Girne.
 14th Armoured Brigade – also in Asha (Paşaköy) with M48 Patton tanks.
 A Special Force Regiment
 An Artillery Regiment
 Naval units
 Logistics Division (Balıkesir)
 57th Artillery Training Brigade (Izmir)
 19th Infantry Brigade (Edremit)
 11th Motorised Infantry Brigade (Denizli)
 5th Army Aviation School Command (Muğla)
 2nd Infantry Regiment (Muğla)
 Commando Training School Command (Isparta)
 3rd Infantry Training Brigade (Antalya)
 1st Infantry Training Brigade (Manisa).
 Training and Doctrine Command (Ankara)
 Logistics Command (Ankara)
 Turkish Military Academy (Ankara)
 Army Aviation Command (operates the fleet of helicopters and UAVs used by the Turkish Army)
 General Staff controlled units (Güvercinlik Army Air Base, Ankara)
 Special Aviation Group Command
 General Staff Electronic Systems (GES) Aviation Group Command
 Mapping General Command
 Unmanned Aerial Vehicle (UAV) Center Command (Batman Air Base)
 Army Aviation Command
 Army Aviation School Command (Güvercinlik Army Air Base)
 5th Main Maintenance Center Command
 1st Army Aviation Regiment (Güvercinlik Army Air Base)
 2nd Army Aviation Regiment (Malatya Erhaç Airport)
 3rd Army Aviation Regiment (Gaziemir Air Base, Izmir)
 4th Army Aviation Regiment (Samandıra Army Air Base, Istanbul)
 7th Army Aviation Group Command (Diyarbakır Air Base)
 Northern Cyprus Turkish Army Aviation Unit Command (Karter Air Base, Pınarbaşı)

Administrative branches

Combatant
 General Staff
 Infantry
 Cavalry
 Armoury
 Army aviation

Battle Supporting
 Artillery
 Bulwark
 Air defence
 Correspondence
 Intelligence

Battle Supporting & Service
 Communications
 Ordnance
 Supplies
 Personnel
 Cartography
 Transportation
 Finance
 Instructor
 Legal
 Military Band
 Medical, Dental and Pharmaceutical Corps
 Veterinary Corps
 Engineer, Chemist and Technician Corps

List of commanders

Equipment

Insignia and ranks

Turkish Land Forces has NATO-compatible rank system.
Officers 1-10 (OF 1-10)

Other Ranks 1-9 (OR 1-9)

 Non-Turkish speakers might like to know that OF3, OF2, and OR2 literally translates as "Head of 1000", "Head of 100", and "Head of 10", respectively.

See also 
 List of commanders of the Turkish Land Forces

Notes

References

External links
  Official Turkish General Staff website
  Official Turkish Army website
 Ranks and insignia in the Turkish Army
 Maps of current dispositions
 One of the new competitors in Africa: Turkey – AARMS (Scientific Journal of the National University of Public Service, Hungary), Volume 11, Issue 1. 2012